Drake, or Hanks Station, is an unincorporated community located in Greene County, Illinois, United States between the town of Patterson and the White Hall/Hillview blacktop. The unofficial population is around 10 people.

External links
NACO-Green County

Unincorporated communities in Greene County, Illinois
Unincorporated communities in Illinois